Bellfield is a suburb of Melbourne, Victoria, Australia, 9 km north-east from Melbourne's Central Business District, located within the City of Banyule local government area. Bellfield recorded a population of 1,996 at the 2021 census.

Geography and description  
Bellfield is bounded in the west by the Darebin Creek, in the north by Bell Street, in the east by Waterdale Road and in the south by Banksia Street.

Bellfield is primarily residential but includes the Banyule Waste Recovery Centre on Waterdale Road and sporting fields in Ford Park and Liberty Park Reserve on Banksia Street, towards Darebin Creek.

Bellfield Cricket Club has represented the suburb in the Heidelberg District Cricket Association since 1934 and is based at Ford Park. Public Library service is provided by Yarra Plenty Regional Library. The nearest library is Ivanhoe Library or the mobile library stop at Heidelberg West.

History 
In 2012 the City of Banyule acquired part of the former Banksia LaTrobe Secondary College in Bellfield which has been decommissioned. It was purchased to allow for high-end residential infill development and also enable revenue to be generated for Council. The Bellfield Urban Design Guidelines were developed and adopted by Council in February 2019.

Governance 
Bellfield is part of the federal Division of Jagajaga in the Australian House of Representatives.

See also
 City of Heidelberg – Bellfield was previously within this former local government area.

References

Suburbs of Melbourne
Suburbs of the City of Banyule